In high energy physics experiments, an absorber is a block of material used to absorb some of the energy of an incident particle. Absorbers can be made of a variety of materials, depending on the purpose; lead, tungsten and liquid hydrogen are common choices. Most absorbers are used as part of a particle detector, particle accelerators use absorbers to reduce the radiation damage on accelerator components.

Other uses of the same word
 Absorbers are used in ionization cooling, as in the International Muon Ionization Cooling Experiment.
 In solar power, a high degree of efficiency is achieved by using black absorbers which reflect off much less of the incoming energy.
 In sunscreen formulations, ingredients which absorb UVA/UVB rays, such as avobenzone and octyl methoxycinnamate, are known as absorbers. They are contrasted with physical "blockers" of UV radiation such as titanium dioxide and zinc oxide.

References

Particle detectors
Accelerator physics